Main Battle Tank: Central Germany is a 1989 video game published by Simulations Canada.

Gameplay
Main Battle Tank: Central Germany is a game in which the player takes the role of either a battalion leader or a brigade/regiment leader in a scenario covered by the fog of war.

Reception
Mike Siggins reviewed Main Battle Tank: West Germany for Games International magazine, and gave it 4 stars out of 5, and stated that "MBT is a very good game and should be an essential purchase for the modern period gamer."

William Bulley reviewed the game for Computer Gaming World, and stated that "Main Battle Tank: Central Germany is a quality game."

References

External links
Review in ST Format #5

1989 video games
Amiga games
Apple II games
Cold War video games
Computer wargames
Simulations Canada video games
Tank simulation video games
Turn-based strategy video games
Video games developed in Canada
Video games set in Germany